Sandelson is a surname. Notable people with the surname include:

 Neville Sandelson (1923–2002), British politician
 Johnny Sandelson (born 1968), British property developer

See also
 Sanderson (surname)